Honychurch is a surname. Notable people with the surname include:

John Honychurch (disambiguation), multiple people
Lennox Honychurch (born 1952), Dominican historian and politician
William Honychurch (by 1489–1530/1531), English politician

See also
Honeychurch (surname)